Stereotypes of Germans include real or imagined characteristics of the German people used by people who see the German people as a single and homogeneous group.

Stereotypes among German people
There exist stereotypes of Western Germans, Wessis, especially "Besserwisser" (people who always know better); and Eastern Germans, Ossis.

Stereotypes with positive use

Extremely punctual people
According to the stereotype, in Germany, everything happens exactly as per schedule and Germans do not tolerate being late for any occasion and are proud of their punctuality. Part of the contribution to this was the similar image of the German work ethic perceived by American GIs in the postwar period: "Many West Germans are serious about their duties, keeping to their timetables, and do not enjoy many tea or coffee breaks". The German railroad system, which occasionally runs late, has been exempt from this stereotype. The punctuality and discipline of the German people has been ridiculed by The Guardian.

Love of order
Attachment to order, organisation and planning is a stereotype of German culture. Germany is perceived to have an abundance of rules (for example, copyright trolls often come from Germany) and Germans are generalized as enjoying obeying them. Jerome K. Jerome's novel Three Men on the Bummel makes fun of the perceived German craving for rules and passion in obeying them; the regimented life of German people is discussed in detail in this novel.

Negative stereotypes

No small talk
Some people think that the Germans are all straightforward and undiplomatic. The perceived inability of the Germans to engage in small talk and their unromantic nature are discussed by foreigners. As far as a German is concerned, 'A yes is a yes and a no is a no.'

Nazis

For Germany perpetrating the Holocaust and starting World War II, Germans are often stereotyped as  Nazis. This stereotype, while now rare, persists to this day. After the war, the German people were often viewed with contempt because they were blamed by other Europeans for Nazi crimes. Germans visiting abroad, particularly in the 1950s and 1960s, attracted insults from locals, and from foreigners who may have lost their families or friends in the atrocities. Today in Europe and worldwide (particularly in countries that fought against the Axis), Germans may be scorned by elderly people who were alive to experience the atrocities committed by Nazi Germans or by veterans who had fought against the Nazis during World War II. This resulted in a feeling of controversy for many Germans, causing numerous discussions and rows among scholars and politicians in Post-War West Germany (for example, the "Historikerstreit" [historians' argument] in the 1980s) and after Reunification. Here, the discussion was mainly about the role that the unified Germany should play in the world and in Europe. Bernard Schlink's novel The Reader concerns how post-war Germans dealt with the issue.

No sense of humour
Germans are perceived to be stiff and humourless. There are many popular culture references to perceived lack of humor in Germany, a notable example being the Funnybot episode of South Park. Edward T. Hall, an American sociologist and intercultural expert, has identified certain dimensions to explain cultural differences. He noted in particular that Germans tend to be task-oriented people, while the French, for example, seem to generally prefer personal relationships.

Attitudes from specific countries
 
British tabloids often portray Germans negatively.

In the course of the Greek government-debt crisis, Germany became a generalized object of  critique as cruel and inflexible.

In Russia, the stereotype of outward seriousness of the German people is the basis for further stereotyping that they are cold and unromantic people. The kindness of the average German may not be observed by tourists who may only notice a reluctance to deal with complete strangers. Russians, on the other hand, also have a positive stereotype of Germans due to being serious and punctual, as well as being good entrepreneurs, thus serving as an inspiration for Russians to develop.

The United States has a mixed view on Germany, in particular World War II movies usually focus on the Germans as opposed to the Japanese or Italians. Since the 1930s to modern day, Hollywood still portrays and makes use of Germans Nazis as villains in films such as Captain America: The First Avenger, The Dirty Dozen, Raiders of the Lost Ark, The Rocketeer, and Inglourious Basterds.

See also 
 Ethnocentrism 
 Stereotype 
 Stereotypes of Jews
 Stereotypes of Americans
 Stereotypes of Argentines

References

External links
Stereotype. Was ist typisch deutsch?

Anti-German sentiment
Germans